Russia competed at the 2014 Winter Olympics in Sochi, from 7 to 23 February 2014 as the host nation. As host, Russia participated in all 15 sports, with a team consisting of 232 athletes. It is Russia's largest Winter Olympics team to date.

In preparation for the Games Russian Olympic Committee naturalized a South Korean-born short-track speed-skater Ahn Hyun-soo and an American-born snowboarder Vic Wild. They won a total of 5 golds and 1 bronze in Sochi.

Russia's medal count in 2014, 33 (before doping disqualifications), was its highest ever in the Winter Olympics, improving on the 1994 Games, when the Russian team earned 23 medals overall, also beating the Soviet Union's best medal count ever at the Winter Olympics.

Bobsledder Aleksandr Zubkov was the flag bearer of the Russian team in the Parade of Nations during the opening ceremony.

Following the Games, it was discovered that Russia's performance has been aided by a wider state-sponsored doping program. On December 9, 2016 Canadian lawyer Richard McLaren published the second part of his independent report. The investigation found that from 2011 to 2015, more than 1,000 Russian competitors in various sports (including summer, winter, and Paralympic sports) benefited from the cover-up.

At the end of 2017, IOC disqualified 43 Russian athletes and stripped Russia from 13 Sochi medals, but Court of Arbitration for Sport nullified 28 out of 43 disqualifications citing insufficient evidence and returned 9 out of 13 medals. In particular, on November 1, 2017 cross-country skiers Evgeniy Belov and gold and silver medalist Alexander Legkov became the first athletes to be disqualified for doping violations after an investigation was completed. Four more were disqualified on November 9, 2017 when Maksim Vylegzhanin, Evgenia Shapovalova, Alexei Petukhov, and Julia Ivanova were sanctioned. The total was brought to ten when gold medalist Aleksandr Tretyakov and bronze medalist Elena Nikitina were banned along with Maria Orlova and Olga Potylitsina who were all skeleton racers. On November 24, 2017 the IOC imposed life bans on bobsledder Alexandr Zubkov and speed skater Olga Fatkulina who won a combined of 3 medals (2 gold, 1 silver). All their results were disqualified, meaning that Russia lost its first place in the medal standings. On November 27, 2017 IOC disqualified Olga Vilukhina, Yana Romanova, Sergey Chudinov, Alexey Negodaylo, and Dmitry Trunenkov, and stripped Vilyukhina and Romanova of their medals in biathlon. Three athletes who didn't win medals (Alexander Kasjanov, Ilvir Huzin, Aleksei Pushkarev) were sanctioned on November 29, 2017. Biathlete Olga Zaitseva who won silver in a relay was disqualified on December 1, 2017. Two other athletes, Anastasia Dotsenko and Yuliya Chekalyova, were also banned. On December 12, 2017 six Russian ice hockey players were disqualified. On 18 December 2017 the IOC imposed a life ban on bobsledder Alexey Voyevoda. Eleven athletes were disqualified on December 22, 2017. Among them, silver medalists Albert Demchenko and Tatiana Ivanova who were stripped of their medals in luge. On 1 February 2018, nine medals were returned after an appeal to the Court of Arbitration for Sport. On 24 September 2020, one more medal was returned after an appeal to the Court of Arbitration for Sport.

Medalists

Alpine skiing 

As a host nation, Russia has qualified a total quota of nine athletes in alpine skiing.

Men

Women

Biathlon 

Based on their performance at the 2012 and 2013 Biathlon World Championships Russia qualified 6 men and 6 women. Irina Starykh originally qualified, but she withdrew from the team after testing positive for doping and was replaced by Olga Podchufarova.

Men

Women

Mixed

Bobsleigh 

Men

* – Denotes the driver of each sled

Women

* – Denotes the driver of each sled

Cross-country skiing 

Russia qualified a maximum of 20 quotas (12 men and 8 women). For the first time since 1956, Russia (previously Soviet Union) failed to win a medal in women's cross-country skiing.

Distance
Men

Women

Sprint
Men

Women

Curling

Men's tournament

Roster
Team: Andrey Drozdov, Aleksey Stukalskiy, Evgeniy Arkhipov, Petr Dron, Aleksandr Kozyrev

Standings

Round robin
Russia has a bye in draws 4, 7 and 11.

Draw 1
Monday, 10 February, 9:00 am

Draw 2Monday, 10 February, 7:00 pm

Draw 3
Tuesday, 11 February, 2:00 pm

Draw 5Wednesday, 12 February, 7:00 pm

Draw 6
Thursday, 13 February, 2:00 pm

Draw 8Friday, 14 February, 7:00 pm

Draw 9
Saturday, 15 February, 2:00 pm

Draw 10Sunday, 16 February, 9:00 am

Draw 12
Monday, 17 February, 2:00 pm

Women's tournament

Roster
Team: Anna Sidorova, Margarita Fomina, Alexandra Saitova, Ekaterina Galkina, Nkeirouka Ezekh

Standings

Round robin
Russia has a bye in draws 5, 8 and 12.

Draw 1Monday, 10 February, 2:00 pm

Draw 2
Tuesday, 11 February, 9:00 am

Draw 3Tuesday, 11 February, 7:00 pm

Draw 4
Wednesday, 12 February, 2:00 pm

Draw 6Thursday, 13 February, 7:00 pm

Draw 7
Friday, 14 February, 2:00 pm

Draw 9Saturday, 15 February, 7:00 pm

Draw 10
Sunday, 16 February, 2:00 pm

Draw 11Monday, 17 February, 9:00 am

Figure skating 

As hosts, Russia was guaranteed a skater in each event.

Russia captured the inaugural gold medal in the team event. Yulia Lipnitskaya, at 15, became the youngest Russian Winter Olympic medalist, while Adelina Sotnikova won the first ever Russian ladies figure skating gold medal.

Team trophy

Freestyle skiing 

Russia qualified a maximum of 26 athletes (14 women and 12 men). Among them, Maria Komissarova had qualified to compete, but was seriously injured at the start of the Games during training, in a fall that left her paralysed below the waist.

Aerials

Halfpipe

Moguls

Ski cross

Qualification legend: FA – Qualify to medal round; FB – Qualify to consolation round

Slopestyle

Ice hockey 

As hosts, Russia automatically qualified a women's team. The men's team qualified as being one of the 9 highest ranked teams in the IIHF World Ranking following the 2012 World Championships (and would have qualified automatically as hosts if it didn’t qualify through rankings).

Men's tournament

Roster

Group stage

Qualification playoffs

Quarterfinals

Women's tournament

On December 12, 2017 six Russian players were disqualified for doping violations and all results of the team were annulled. Tatiana Burina and Anna Shukina were also disqualified ten days later.

Roster

Group stage

Quarterfinals

5–8th place semifinals

Fifth place game

Luge 

Earning automatic places as a host nation, Russia has qualified a maximum of 10 spots (7 men, 3 women, and a relay team).

Men

Women

Mixed team relay

Nordic combined

Short track speed skating 

As hosts, Russia have been given the maximum 5 men and 5 women to compete. On 10 February 2014, Viktor Ahn won the bronze medal in the 1500 m short track speedskating event. He won the first short track speedskating medal that Russia has earned while competing as Russia. On 15 February 2014, Ahn won the first Russian gold medal in short track at the 1000 m event, leading the first Russian 1-2 finish in short track, with Vladimir Grigorev winning silver. At 31 years and 191 days, Grigorev also became the oldest man to win a short track Olympic medal, with that silver. On 21 February 2014, he won the gold in the 5000 m relay, upping the oldest shorttrack male athlete record for both medals and gold medals.

Men

Women

Qualification legend: ADV – Advanced due to being impeded by another skater; FA – Qualify to medal round; FB – Qualify to consolation round

Skeleton 

Russia qualified a maximum of 6 athletes (3 men and 3 women).

Ski jumping 

Russia has qualified a total of six athletes (five men and one woman)

Men

Women

Snowboarding 

Russia qualified a total of 15 athletes (11 men and 4 women). Vic Wild won two gold medals, which became the first ever gold medals for Russia in snowboarding. Alena Zavarzina won a bronze medal in giant parallel slalom.

Alpine
Men

Women

Freestyle

Qualification Legend: QF – Qualify directly to final; QS – Qualify to semifinal

Snowboard cross

Qualification legend: FA – Qualify to medal round; FB – Qualify to consolation round

Speed skating 

Based on the results from the fall World Cups during the 2013–14 ISU Speed Skating World Cup season, Russia earned the following start quotas:

Men

Women

Team pursuit

 Russia earned the max quotas (ten women and ten men) for speed skating, but only eight women competed. Viktoriya Filyushkina was a reserve for ladies' 3000 meter and Lada Zadonskaya was a reserve for ladies' 5000 meter. Both women qualified and were included in the Russian speed skating squad but did not get to compete by the decision of the Russian speed skating federation.

Doping scandal after Olympics 

In December 2014, German public broadcaster ARD aired a documentary which made wide-ranging allegations that Russia organized a state-run doping program which supplied their athletes with performance-enhancing drugs.  In November 2015, Russia's track and field team was provisionally suspended by the IAAF.

In May 2016, The New York Times published allegations by the former director of Russia's anti-doping laboratory, Grigory Rodchenkov, that a conspiracy of corrupt anti-doping officials, FSB intelligence agents, and compliant Russian athletes used banned substances to gain an unfair advantage during the Games. Rodchenkov stated that the FSB tampered with over 100 urine samples as part of a cover-up, and that at least fifteen of the Russian medals won at Sochi were the result of doping.

In December, 2016, following the release of the McLaren report on Russian doping at the Sochi Olympics, the International Olympic Committee announced the initiation of an investigation of 28 Russian athletes at the Sochi Olympic Games. Italian newspaper La Gazzetta dello Sport reported the names of 17 athletes, of whom 15 are among the 28 under investigation. The Russian team potentially could be stripped of up to 12 Olympic medals.

Three ladies artistic skaters were named as being under investigation. They are Adelina Sotnikova, the singles gold medalist, as well as pairs skaters Tatiana Volosozhar and Ksenia Stolbova. Volosozhar and Stolbova won gold and silver medals, respectively, in pairs skating. Both also won gold medals in the team event, which also puts the other eight team medalists at risk of losing their golds.

Six skiers were suspended from competition on the basis of the McLaren report: Evgeniy Belov, Alexander Legkov, Alexey Petukhov, Maxim Vylegzhanin, Yulia Ivanova, and Yevgeniya Shapovalova. Legkov won a gold medal, and Vylegzhanin won three silver medals.

The International Biathlon Union suspended two biathletes who were in the Sochi games: Olga Vilukhina and Yana Romanova, according to La Gazzetta dello Sport. Vilukhina won silver in sprint, and both women were on a relay team that won the silver medal.

The International Bobsleigh and Skeleton Federation suspended four skeleton sliders. They are among the six athletes on the skeleton team: Nikita Tregubov, Alexander Tretyakov, Elena Nikitina, Maria Orlova, and Olga Potylitsina. Tretyakov won a gold medal, and Nikitina won a bronze.

See also
Russia at the 2014 Summer Youth Olympics

References

External links 

Russia at the 2014 Winter Olympics

Nations at the 2014 Winter Olympics
2014
Winter Olympics
Doping in Russia